Đỗ Văn Thuận (born 25 May 1992) is a Vietnamese footballer who plays as a midfielder for Bình Định in the V.League 1 and the Vietnamese national team.

References 

1992 births
Living people
Vietnamese footballers
Association football midfielders
Saigon FC players
V.League 1 players
Viettel FC players
Ho Chi Minh City FC players
Binh Dinh FC players
Sportspeople from Hanoi
Vietnam international footballers